Walisson Oliveira da Silva (born 8 February 1999), known as Walisson Pequeno, is a Brazilian retired footballer who played as a forward.

Professional career
Pequeno made his professional debut with Santa Cruz in a 2-0 Campeonato Pernambucano loss to on 21 January 2018.

References

External links
 

1999 births
Living people
Sportspeople from Tocantins
Brazilian footballers
Association football forwards
Goiás Esporte Clube players
Santa Cruz Futebol Clube players
Campeonato Pernambucano players